The Mermaid Series was a major collection of reprints of texts from English Elizabethan, Jacobean and Restoration drama. It was launched in 1887 by the British publisher Henry Vizetelly and under the general editorship of Havelock Ellis. Around 1894 the series was taken over by the London firm of T. Fisher Unwin. Many well-known literary figures edited or introduced the texts. Some of the plays published had not been reprinted in recent editions, and most had dropped out of the stage repertoire.

The name alludes to the Mermaid Tavern in London. There has been a later New Mermaids Series.

The Best Plays of Beaumont and Fletcher
Notes by John Strachey, two volumes

(volume I) The Maid's Tragedy - Philaster - The Wild Goose Chase - Thierry and Theodoret - The Knight of the Burning Pestle

(volume II) A King and No King - Bonduca - The Spanish Curate - The Faithful Shepherdess - Valentinian

The Best Plays of George Chapman
Edited by William Lyon Phelps

All Fools - Bussy D'Ambois - The Revenge of Bussy D'Ambois - The Conspiracy of Charles, Duke of Byron - The Tragedy of Charles, Duke of Byron

The Complete Plays of William Congreve
Edited by Alexander Charles Ewald

The Old Bachelor - The Double-Dealer - Love for Love - The Way of the World - The Mourning Bride

The Best Plays of Thomas Dekker
Notes by Ernest Rhys

The Shoemaker's Holiday - The Honest Whore - Old Fortunatus - The Witch of Edmonton

The Best Plays of John Dryden
Edited by George Saintsbury, two volumes

(Volume I) Almanzor and Almahide, or The Conquest of Grenada, parts 1 & 2 - Marriage A La Mode - Aureng-Zebe

(Volume II) All for Love - The Spanish Friar - Albion and Albanius - Don Sebastian

The Best Plays of George Farquhar
Edited by William Archer

The Constant Couple - The Twin Rivals - The Recruiting Officer - The Beaux' Stratagem

The Best Plays of John Ford
Edited by Havelock Ellis

The Lover's Melancholy - 'Tis Pity She's a Whore - The Broken Heart - Love's Sacrifice - Perkin Warbeck

The Complete Plays of Robert Greene
Edited by Thomas H. Dickinson

Alphonsus, King of Arragon - A Looking Glass for London and England - Orlando Furioso - Friar Bacon and Friar Bungay - James the Fourth - George-A-Green, the Pinner of Wakefield

The Best Plays of Thomas Heywood
Edited by A. Wilson Verity, introduction by John Addington Symonds

A Woman Killed with Kindness - The Fair Maid of the West - The English Traveller - The Wise Woman of Hogsdon - The Rape of Lucrece

The Best Plays of Ben Jonson
Notes by Brinsley Nicholson and C. H. Herford, three volumes

(Volume I) Every Man in His Humour - Every Man out of His Humour - The Poetaster

(Volume II) Bartholomew Fair - Cynthia's Revels; or, The Fountain of Self-Love - Sejanus His Fall

(Volume III) Volpone; or, The Fox - Epicœne; or, The Silent Woman - The Alchemist

The Best Plays of Christopher Marlowe
Notes by Havelock Ellis, series introduction by John Addington Symonds

Tamburlaine the Great Part the First - Tamburlaine the Great Part the Second
- Doctor Faustus - The Jew of Malta - Edward the Second

Also includes a biography of Christopher Marlowe and appendices.

The Best Plays of Philip Massinger
Notes by Arthur Symons, two volumes

(Volume I) The Duke of Milan - A New Way to Pay Old Debts - The Great Duke of Florence - The Maid of Honour - The City Madam

(Volume II) The Roman Actor - The Fatal Dowry - The Guardian - The Virgin Martyr - Believe as You List

The Best Plays of Thomas Middleton
Introduction by Algernon Charles Swinburne, with Havelock Ellis, two volumes

(Volume I) A Trick to Catch the Old One - The Changeling - A Chaste Maid in Cheapside - Women Beware Women - The Spanish Gypsy

(Volume II) The Roaring Girl - The Witch - A Fair Quarrel - The Mayor of Queensborough - The Widow

Nero and Other Plays (1888)
Edited by H. P. Horne, A. W. Verity, Arthur Symons and Havelock Ellis

Nero (anonymous) - The Two Angry Women of Abington (Henry Porter) - The Parliament of Bees (John Day) - Humour Out of Breath (John Day) - A Woman is a Weathercock (Nathan Field)- Amends for Ladies (Nathan Field)

The Best Plays of Thomas Otway
Notes by Roden Noel

Don Carlos, Prince of Spain - The Orphan - The Soldier's Fortune - Venice Preserved

The Best Plays of Thomas Shadwell
Edited by George Saintsbury

The Sullen Lovers - A True Widow - The Squire of Alsatia - Bury Fair

The Best Plays of James Shirley
Introduction by Edmund Gosse

The Witty Fair One - The Traitor - Hyde Park - The Lady of Pleasure - The Cardinal - The Triumph of Peace

The Complete Plays of Richard Steele
Edited by G. A. Aitken

The Funeral - The Lying Lover - The Tender Husband - The Conscious Lovers - The School of Action - The Gentleman

The Select Plays of Sir John Vanbrugh
Edited by A. E. H. Swain

The Relapse - The Provok'd Wife - The Confederacy - A Journey to London

The Best Plays of Webster and Tourneur
Notes by John Addington Symonds

The White Devil (Webster) - The Duchess of Malfi (Webster) - The Atheist's Tragedy (Tourneur) - The Revenger's Tragedy (Tourneur, but now usually attributed to Thomas Middleton)

The Complete Plays of William Wycherley
Edited by W. C. Ward

Love in a Wood - The Gentleman Dancing Master - The Country Wife - The Plain Dealer

Online editions

 • 
 • 
 • 
 • 
 • 
 • 
 • 
 • 
 • 
 • 
 • 
 • 
 • 
 • 
 • 
 • 
 • 
 • 
 • 
 • 
 • 
 • 
 • 
 • 
 • 
 •

References

Series of books